The Wauwatosa Woman's Club Clubhouse is located in Wauwatosa, Wisconsin. It was added to the National Register of Historic Places in 1998.

Wauwatosa Woman's Club
The Wauwatosa Woman's Club was founded in 1894. It was incorporated in 1907. The stated purpose of the club was “The social and intellectual development of women through a free interchange of thought, by a course of careful study, essays and discussions.” In 1914 Emerson D. Hoyt donated the lot on 1626 Wauwatosa Avenue for a clubhouse, with the provision that the structure also be used as a museum to preserve the early history of Wauwatosa. Hoyt also stipulated that the woman's club members would need to raise $10,000 within two years' time. The project faltered with onset of World War I, but the women were given an extension and ultimately raise the required amount. The clubhouse become a social center for the women of Wauwatosa. The club remains active.

Building
The Wauwatosa Woman's Club Clubhouse was designed by Kirchhoff & Rose in the Colonial Revival style and completed in 1925. The building is two stories, with a hip and deck roof. The walls are clad in red brick with white trim. The front entrance is sheltered by a portico supported by Tuscan columns and pilasters. Behind it, the center bay is framed in brick quoins. Many windows are topped with a keystone design and framed in a shallow brick arch. The eaves are trimmed with a modillioned cornice and a large pediment tops the center bay.  The clubhouse was listed on the National Register of Historic Places in 1998.

References

Clubhouses on the National Register of Historic Places in Wisconsin
Buildings and structures in Milwaukee County, Wisconsin
Colonial Revival architecture in Wisconsin
Buildings and structures completed in 1925
Wauwatosa, Wisconsin
National Register of Historic Places in Milwaukee County, Wisconsin
History of women in Wisconsin